Kenneth James Noye (born 24 May 1947) is an English criminal most recently sentenced to life imprisonment for murdering Stephen Cameron in a road rage incident while on licence from prison in 1996. He was arrested in Spain two years later and convicted of the crime four years after it occurred.

A former police informant, Noye was acquitted in 1985 of the murder of a police officer in the grounds of his home, and was convicted in 1986 of conspiracy to handle stolen goods from the Brink's-Mat robbery, sentenced to 14 years' imprisonment of which he served eight years in custody. He was on licence from that sentence when he murdered Mr Cameron. Noye was released on licence from the murder sentence in 2019.

Early life
Noye was born in Bexleyheath, Kent (now in Greater London) where his father ran a post office and his mother a dog racing track. His dishonesty began at a young age. At five, his mother caught him taking money from the till in a branch of Woolworths while she had been talking to a shop assistant. A bully while a pupil at Bexleyheath Boys' Secondary Modern School, he ran a protection racket with his fellow pupils. He left school at 15. For selling stolen bicycles after he had altered their appearance, and other crimes, he spent a year in a borstal. He met a barrister's legal secretary, Brenda Tremain, who later became his wife.

Criminal activities 
A police informant for many years, Noye had begun a connection with corrupt officers by the time he was arrested for receiving stolen goods in 1977. He became a Freemason in January 1980, becoming a member of the Hammersmith Lodge in London after being proposed for admission by two police officers, giving his occupation as "Builder".

The membership of the Lodge contained a sizeable proportion of police, according to an April 2000 article in The Independent. Noye's membership ceased in 1987 because he had failed to pay his subscriptions for two years in succession. He was subsequently expelled from the Freemasons when it was discovered that he had a criminal record, according to a letter from the Grand Secretary of the United Grand Lodge of England, published by The Independent in December 1996.

One of Noye's police contacts persuaded a customs official not to target him, while his tip-offs to the Metropolitan Police's Flying Squad were reportedly a means to prevent competition from rival criminals. Meanwhile, he had built up a legitimate haulage business to use as cover. Having initially been refused planning permission for a mansion on a plot of land he owned, he was able to gain consent in a subsequent application shortly after his bungalow on the site was destroyed in a fire caused by an electrical fault.

Brink's-Mat robbery
Active as a fence, Noye was among those involved in laundering a huge quantity of stolen gold bullion taken during the Brink's-Mat robbery by six armed men on 26 November 1983. While he was being investigated for his involvement in the crime, Noye fatally stabbed Detective Constable John Fordham who was involved in the police surveillance of Noye in the grounds of his home. Acquitted of murder on the grounds of self-defence in December 1985, he was found guilty in July 1986 of conspiracy to handle some of the stolen gold, and of a conspiracy to evade VAT. After his conviction in court, he shouted to the jury "I hope you all die of cancer".

The discovery of the bullion had surprised the gang as they expected to find £3 million in cash; their contacts had no experience of dealing with gold, let alone 6,800 bars worth £26 million in 1983. Mick McAvoy, one of the thieves, had asked Brian Perry to conceal the gold he had received, and it was Perry who brought in Noye and John Palmer, subsequently nicknamed "Goldfinger"; Palmer was acquitted in 1987 of knowingly handling gold from the robbery.

Noye had melted down much of the Brink's-Mat gold he had received, and mixed it with copper coins in an attempt to disguise its origins, although 11 gold bars from the robbery were found hidden at his home. Sentenced to 14 years, and fined £500,000 with £200,000 costs, he was released from prison in 1994, having served eight years. In a civil action brought by the loss adjusters of Brink's-Mat's insurers, £3 million was recovered from Noye while he was imprisoned.

Murder of Stephen Cameron
On 19 May 1996, while on release from prison on licence, Noye was involved in an altercation with 21-year-old motorist Stephen Cameron on a slip road of the M25 motorway near Swanley in Kent during a road rage incident. During the fight, Noye stabbed Cameron to death with a 9-inch knife. Noye immediately fled the country, later revealed to have been assisted by Palmer, who later claimed to have barely known Noye, if at all. While Noye was on the run, Detective Constable John Donald was jailed for 11 years for passing on confidential information about police operations to Noye.

Police initially named the man they wanted to question in connection with the murder as Anthony Francis. However, by December 1996 this name was revealed to have been a false identity used by Noye, after a vehicle registered in his name was discovered to have been unloaded in Kyrenia, Cyprus, in July that year. The vehicle was a dark green L-registered Land Rover Discovery, which matched the description of the vehicle driven by the man who had fatally stabbed Stephen Cameron. However, Noye was not located in Cyprus, and due to Kyrenia's location in the Turkish occupied northern part of the country, Britain did not have the extradition treaties in place which would have allowed Noye to be extradited back to Britain if he had been tracked down to Northern Cyprus. It was nearly two more years before Noye was finally located.

A significant police hunt assisted by GCHQ led to Noye being located in Spain, where he was arrested in the resort of Barbate near Gibraltar on 28 August 1998. Cameron's girlfriend Danielle Cable, who had witnessed the killing, was secretly flown out to positively identify him, which she did on 27 August. Noye was arrested the following day, and lost an appeal against his extradition from Spain seven months later. He was finally extradited to Britain in May 1999, nine months after his arrest, and went on trial 10 months later.

Despite the risk involved, Cable opted to testify against Noye. Noye claimed not to be a violent man at the trial, and again pleaded self-defence, explaining that he had fled because the police hated him and he feared not receiving a fair trial. Found guilty on 14 April 2000, after a trial held in conditions of high security, Noye was convicted of murder by the jury's majority verdict of 11–1 after their deliberations had lasted 8 hours and 21 minutes, and was given a life sentence by Lord Justice Latham. Despite evidence of his wealth, Noye’s legal aid costs amounted to about £250,000 for his defence at the trial (and he also received financial support for his initial appeal).

After auditors in an official inquiry found the correct procedures in such cases had not been followed, one of the officials responsible for Noye's financial support in the Lord Chancellor's office resigned, while another was disciplined. Cable was given a new identity under the witness protection programme, having been praised by police for her courage in giving evidence in the presence of Noye and his associates.

The judge at Noye's trial did not make any recommendation in open court on the tariff for how long Noye should serve, but made the then-conventional written report to the Lord Chief Justice and the Home Secretary recommending a tariff of 16 years. In 2002 the then-Home Secretary David Blunkett duly set the tariff, before Noye could apply for parole at 16 years as recommended. This tariff was subsequently upheld by Mr Justice Simon.

Alan Decabral case

Another eyewitness in the Cameron murder, Alan Decabral, declined protection and was shot dead in his car in front of shoppers through his open window in Ashford, Kent, on 5 October 2000. Police sources were in no doubt that Decabral was killed by a professional hitman. Police sources also stated that Decabral had been questioned about gun smuggling, had extensive criminal contacts, and his estranged wife later admitted that he had been a drug dealer who owed money to others. Although Noye was questioned by the police, they concluded that the still-unsolved murder had no proven connection with him and did not charge Noye. The location Decabral was killed at was the car park outside Sainsburys on Simone Weil Avenue in Ashford, and occurred in broad daylight at 1:30pm. 

Decabral had testified at the trial of Noye at the Old Bailey that he saw the fight between Noye and Cameron on the motorway slip road, and told the jury that he saw Noye "lunging forward" with a knife and stabbing Cameron, testimony that helped convict him. The defence had attempted to discredit Decabral, saying he was an unreliable witness who created an "edifice of lies" in agreement with police. 

After Decabral's murder Noye's defence team, led by Michael Mansfield QC, continued to attempt to discredit him as a witness in order to win Noye's release. Before he died, Decabral had received death threats in relation to his involvement in the case against Noye and said that he had been ordered by unknown gangsters to "shut up or we will shut you up." He also said that someone had pushed three bullets through his letterbox with a warning. After the trial he had notably said "I look over my shoulder every time I go into Sainsbury's" (the murder took place in Sainsbury's car park).

Police investigated whether Decabral was killed as part of a fight between rival biker gangs over drugs. Witnesses to the murder in the retail park said they heard Decabral beg for his life before a young man in a woolly hat shot him.

Prison sentence and later legal proceedings
On 10 October 2001 and again in 2004, Noye appealed unsuccessfully against his conviction. He was represented in 2001 by Michael Mansfield, QC. In 2007 a legal challenge was made against the Criminal Cases Review Commission's decision not to refer his case to the Court of Appeal as "legally flawed".

On 7 March 2008, on a new legal challenge, Lord Justice Richards and Mrs Justice Swift granted permission for a one-day judicial review hearing, covering the CCRC's October 2006 decision not to send Noye's case back to the Court of Appeal.

On 25 June 2010, Noye's bid to have the minimum term he must serve for murder reduced was rejected. Mr Justice Simon, a High Court judge sitting at Newcastle, ordered that he must spend at least 16 years in jail before he could be considered for parole. On 14 October of that year, Noye was granted a fresh appeal against his conviction for Cameron's murder, but it was rejected on 22 March 2011. Noye was reported to have been moved from the Category A prison, HM Prison Whitemoor, to a Category B prison, at Lowdham Grange, in September 2011. Noye was formerly at Category C HM Prison Wayland in Griston, Norfolk. Another appeal, this time against the tariff, was dismissed on 12 March 2013. A key Police informant Salar Golestanian, an Iranian computer programmer living in Surrey, gave evidence to the judges sitting in the appeal court of Kenneth Noye's involvement in cold case file crimes. Kenneth Noye was returned to HMP Wayland, and now had to serve his full sentence.

On 13 February 2015, BBC News reported that Noye had been granted a parole hearing. The Parole Board said the case had been referred by the secretary of state. Noye was refused permission to move to an open prison by Justice Secretary Michael Gove in October 2015 after such a move had been recommended by the parole board.

However, in the High Court, Mr Justice Lavender accepted a legal challenge in February 2017 that Gove had "failed to give proper or adequate weight to the recommendation of the Parole Board". Edward Fitzgerald, QC, acting for Noye, said during the previous month's hearing that the board had "noted that he had made significant progress in changing his attitudes and tackling his behavioural problems". Counsel for the Justice Secretary, Tom Weisselberg, QC, said Gove had doubted Noye had reformed, and considered there was the risk he would escape because of his connections to Spain. it was announced in August 2017 that Gove's successor David Lidington had agreed Noye should be moved to open prison conditions. It was said by the parole board that this change was not in preparation for Noye's release.

Around March 2018, Noye was moved to HM Prison Standford Hill on the Isle of Sheppey, which is a low security prison with a day release provision for prisoners.

In May 2019, the parole board announced that Noye was "suitable for return to the community" and would be released from prison within about three months.

On 6 June 2019, then aged 72, Noye was released from prison after serving 20 years for the M25 attack. The parole board said that his release remained a risk due to "his readiness to carry and use weapons" and because Noye was "not being able to resolve arguments reasonably at key moments" as he "did not always control extreme emotions well”.

Hatton Garden robbery link
In 2016, it was reported that the leader of a gang who carried out the Hatton Garden safe deposit burglary was a former top lieutenant of Noye. The man, Brian Reader, had been charged alongside Noye for murdering undercover police surveillance officer John Fordham, in the grounds of Noye's home in 1985. Like Noye, Reader was acquitted of Fordham's murder. However, he was convicted of conspiracy to handle stolen property and cash from the Brink's-Mat robbery, for which he received a nine-year jail sentence in 1986.

Personal life
Noye's wife, Brenda, lives in the east Cornwall town of Looe. They have two sons, one of whom, Brett, was banned in 2013 from being a company director for 12 years for his part in a £2.4 million investor deception scheme involving a rat poison company.

Noye's villa in Atlanterra, southern Spain, which was purchased for £200,000 cash in 1997, was reportedly sold for £500,000 in 2001.

References

1947 births
Living people
20th-century English criminals
1996 murders in the United Kingdom
Criminals from Kent
Criminals from London
English gangsters
English people convicted of murder
English prisoners sentenced to life imprisonment
Freemasons of the United Grand Lodge of England
People acquitted of murder
People convicted of murder by England and Wales
People from Bexleyheath
Prisoners sentenced to life imprisonment by England and Wales